Schirmer is a German surname. Notable people with the surname include:

 Adolf Schirmer (1850–1930), Norwegian architect
 Astrid Schirmer, German operatic soprano
 August Schirmer (1905–1948), German Nazi propagandist
 David Schirmer (1623–1686), German poet
 Johann Wilhelm Schirmer (1807–1863), German painter
 Friedrich Wilhelm Schirmer (1802–1866), German painter
 Gerhart Schirmer (1913–2004), German officer
 Heinrich Ernst Schirmer (1814–1887), Norwegian-German architect
 Herman Major Schirmer (1845–1913), Norwegian architect and art historian
 Marcel Schirmer (born 1966), German thrash metal musician
 Markus Schirmer (born 1963), Austrian pianist
 Øistein Schirmer (1879–1947), Norwegian gymnast
 Otto Schirmer (1864–1918), German ophthalmologist
 Rudolf Schirmer (1831–1896), German ophthalmologist
 Ulf Schirmer (born 1959), German conductor

See also 
 Schirmer's test, ocular test
 G. Schirmer, American classical music publishing company
 Schirmer Records, American record label

German-language surnames
Occupational surnames